Albert Bell may refer to:

 Albert Bell (American football) (born 1964), wide receiver in the National Football League
 Albert Bell (footballer, born 1898), English footballer

See also
 Albert Belle (born 1966), former American Major League Baseball outfielder